Cerioporus is a genus of fungi in the family Polyporaceae.  The type species is Cerioporus squamosus.  Many species in Cerioporus were formerly placed in the genus Polyporus, however phylogenetic analysis shows that Cerioporus is a separate genus. It has been reported that mushrooms have significant antioxidant and antimicrobial activity.

Structure of basidiocarp 
The basidiocarps are tough, especially when mature.  The form is polyporoid to trametoid.  The spores are fusoid.

Hyphae 
The hyphae are dimitic, composed of binding or skeletal hyphae.  The skeletal hyphae are inflated and axial.

Species

 Cerioporus admirabilis
 Cerioporus choseniae
 Cerioporus corylinus  
 Cerioporus hygrocybe
 Cerioporus leptocephalus
 Cerioporus meridionalis  
 Cerioporus squamosus (type species)
 Cerioporus rhizophilus  
 Cerioporus stereoides  
 Cerioporus varius  
 Cerioporus vassilievae

References

External links

 Lentinoid and Polyporoid Fungi, Two Generic Conglomerates Containing Important Medicinal Mushrooms in Molecular Perspective